Thank You for Using GTL is a 2020 album by Drakeo the Ruler. It was produced by JoogSZN with verses recorded by Drakeo from Men's Central Jail using phone service from GTL.

Reception

Thank You for Using GTL received positive reviews from critics. Matthew Ismael Ruiz at Pitchfork called it "likely the greatest rap album ever recorded from jail". Daniel Bromfield at Spectrum Culture noted its themes of "the carceral state, capitalism, the prison-industrial complex, the U.S. criminal justice system's targeting of rap and rappers, and the ongoing game of real vs. fiction taking place within hip hop itself."

Accolades

Track listing

References

2020 albums